"Military Waltz" is a World War I song composed by Frederic Knight Logan. This song was published in 1917 by F.J.A. Forster, in Chicago, Illinois. 
The sheet music cover features three soldiers dancing with women in a ballroom.

The sheet music can be found at the Pritzker Military Museum & Library.

References

Bibliography
Parker, Bernard S. World War I Sheet Music 1. Jefferson: McFarland & Company, Inc., 2007. . 
Vogel, Frederick G. World War I Songs: A History and Dictionary of Popular American Patriotic Tunes, with Over 300 Complete Lyrics. Jefferson: McFarland & Company, Inc., 1995. . 

1917 songs
Songs of World War I
Waltzes